SB or Sb may refer to:

Places
 Saint Pierre and Miquelon (FIPS PUB 10-4 territory code SB)
 Santa Barbara, California, US
 San Bernardino, California, US
 Solomon Islands (ISO 3166 country code SB)
 South Burlington, Vermont
 Sibiu County, Romania

Organisations
 Special Branch, of UK and some Commonwealth police
 Służba Bezpieczeństwa, secret police in communist Poland
 Sluzhba Bezpeky, WWII Ukrainian partisan underground intelligence service
 Shaw Brothers Studio, a Hong Kong movie company
 Statistics Bureau (Japan)

Science and technology
 SB buffer, for electrophoresis
 Antimony, symbol Sb, a chemical element
 Barred spiral galaxy, in astronomy
 Scientiæ Baccalaureus or Bachelor of Science, an academic degree
 Spectroscopic binary stars, designated SB1 and SB2
 Stilb (unit) (symbol sb), a unit of luminance
 sideband
Spina bifida

Computing
 .sb file, the file format for Scratch Projects
 .sb2 file and .sb3, the file formats for Scratch 2 and 3
 .sb, Internet country code top-level domain for Solomon Islands

Sport and games
 Nike SB, skateboarding shoes
 "Season's Best", an athletics abbreviation
 Stolen base, in baseball
 Sonneborn–Berger score, a scoring system often used to break ties in chess tournaments
 Super Bowl, annual American football championship
 Smash Bros., a platform fighting video game series featuring characters from Nintendo and third-party franchises
 Skyblock, a Minecraft minigame, and MMORPG game on Minecraft server, Hypixel

Transportation
 Aircalin (IATA airline code)
 Sailing barge (ship prefix)
 Skagensbanen (the Skagen Railway), a Danish railway line and company
 South Buffalo Railway (reporting code)
 Surabaya Kota railway station, Surabaya, East Java, Indonesia (station code: SB)
 Tupolev SB, a Soviet bomber of World War II
 Toyota SB, car
 SB craft, an Imperial Japanese Army variant of the Imperial Japanese Navy's No. 101-class landing ship

Other uses
 Special Warfare Boat Operator rating, US Navy
 Senate Bill, typically coded like "SB 1234"
 Sonderbehandlung, German Nazi era euphemism for mass murder
 Soldier Boy, three fictional superheroes
 Substantive, or noun, in some languages

See also

BS (disambiguation)
B (disambiguation)
S (disambiguation)
SBS (disambiguation)

Saint
St. Bonaventure